Jan Vrba (born 28 January 1982 in Jablonec nad Nisou) is a Czech bobsledder who has competed since 2004. His best World Cup finish was 5th at Altenberg  in the four-man event (2005: St. Moritz, 2009: Altenberg).

Vrba was selected to compete at the 2010 Winter Olympics in the four-man event where he finished 16th.

References

External links

 
 

1982 births
Bobsledders at the 2010 Winter Olympics
Bobsledders at the 2014 Winter Olympics
Bobsledders at the 2018 Winter Olympics
Czech male bobsledders
Living people
Olympic bobsledders of the Czech Republic
Sportspeople from Jablonec nad Nisou